Ossian Wuorenheimo  (until 1906 Bergbom) (3 December 1845, Viborg - 13 June  1917, Helsinki) was a Finnish politician. He was a member of the Senate of Finland.

1845 births
1917 deaths
Politicians from Vyborg
People from Viipuri Province (Grand Duchy of Finland)
Finnish Party politicians
Finnish senators
Members of the Diet of Finland